Sampo Corporation is a major manufacturing company in Taiwan. It manufactures household electrical items, including televisions, air-conditioners, and washing machines. The company has collaborated with Taiwanese company, TCL. It also manufactures PDP-TVs for Thompson on a contract basis.

In 1967, Sampo and Sony established a joint venture in Taiwan, "Sony Taiwan Limted". In 2000, Sony headquarters in Japan withdrew its agency rights and consolidated all Sony affiliates in Taiwan, ended the partnership between Sampo. 

In 1969, Sampo and Sharp cooperated to manufacture color televisions. In 1990, Sharp Corporation (Taiwan) was established by Sharp and Sampo as the official branch of Sharp in Taiwan, responsible for the import and sales of Sharp's products. This partnership ended when Foxconn acquired Sharp in 2016.

References 

Electronics companies of Taiwan
Home appliance manufacturers of Taiwan
Heating, ventilation, and air conditioning companies
Companies based in Taoyuan City
Electronics companies established in 1936
Manufacturing companies established in 1936
Taiwanese brands